The Tornado outbreak of June 14–18, 1992 was one of the largest tornado outbreaks on record, affecting portions of the Central United States from June 14 to June 18, 1992.  The outbreak began on June 14 when six tornadoes touched down in Colorado and Idaho.  Fifty-eight tornadoes were reported across portions of the Great Plains on June 15, and 65 more were reported over much of the central U.S. on June 16.  The 123 tornadoes that touched down on June 15–16 make that two-day span the 5th largest two-day tornado outbreak in U.S. history behind the 1974 Super Outbreak, the May 2004 tornado outbreak sequence, the tornado outbreak of April 14–16, 2011, and the 2011 Super Outbreak. Twenty-eight more tornadoes touched down on June 17, and 13 more touched down on June 18, giving this outbreak 170 confirmed tornadoes.

Meteorological synopsis
A major spring storm began developing in the western United States over the weekend of June 13–14, 1992. The storm ejected a minor upper air impulse across the Northern Plains on June 13, triggering severe weather across the extreme northwest corner of South Dakota. Golf ball sized hail and 10 inches of rain destroyed crops and killed over 500 sheep in Harding County, South Dakota. This event preceded the main storm which still was positioned over the western United States.  As the storm moved to the east over the next several days, it caused 170 tornadoes in the central United States, including an F5 tornado in Chandler, Minnesota.  The storm system finally began to weaken as it moved to the eastern United States on June 18.

Outbreak description
On Tuesday, June 16, 1992, eastern South Dakota and southwest Minnesota were heavily impacted by the storm as it moved from the Rocky Mountain Region across the Upper Midwest.  At least two dozen tornadoes were reported that day, with more than three times that many reports of large hail and strong winds, causing widespread swaths of damage to crops, buildings, and other personal property across much of eastern South Dakota and southwest Minnesota. The first tornado, spawned by a supercell thunderstorm, touched down in Charles Mix County, South Dakota about 1:00 pm. The last tornado was reported shortly before midnight that evening, ending an 11-hour period of intense severe weather across eastern South Dakota and southwest Minnesota.  Until the record was broken in 2010, the 27 tornadoes that touched down in Minnesota on June 16 mark the largest single day tornado outbreak in Minnesota since accurate records started being kept in 1950.

Remarkably there was only one fatality from this outbreak, that coming from an F5 tornado in Chandler, Minnesota.  In addition to the F5, three F4 tornadoes were reported in Murray County, Minnesota, and Mitchell and McPherson counties in Kansas.  Damage estimates for the two days were in excess of $160 million.

This outbreak played a large part in a record setting month in June, 1992.  The 399 tornadoes that touched down in that month was a United States record at the time, breaking the old record of 335 tornadoes set in May, 1991. This record was eventually broken, when 543 tornadoes touched down during May, 2003. This record, though, would broken in turn when over 750 tornadoes touched down in April 2011.

Confirmed tornadoes

June 14 event

June 15 event

June 16 event

Chandler–Lake Wilson, Minnesota

A tornado touched down shortly after 5:00 pm CDT in Extreme Northwestern Nobles County, near Leota. It destroyed a two-house farmstead just east of Leota as it strengthened and moved northeast toward Chandler and Lake Wilson. The tornado reached its greatest size and strength as it came over the hill immediately south of Chandler, moving into the residential area of Western Chandler at approximately 5:18 pm CDT.

The tornado destroyed more than 75 homes with another 90 homes, 10 businesses, a church and school damaged. It caused over $50 million in property damage, causing one fatality and more than 40 injuries. Based on damage assessment by the National Weather Service, this tornado was at F5 intensity as it moved through the residential area of Chandler, where homes were swept completely away and vehicles were thrown hundreds of yards and stripped down to their frames. This was the only F5 tornado to occur in the United States in 1992.

Non-tornadic events
In addition to the severe weather, another devastating weather event was taking place across northeastern South Dakota. Heavy rains were occurring in an area already saturated by previous rains. Over a two- to three-day period in mid-June 1992, 15 to 20 inches of rain fell in the Clear Lake-Watertown area of northeast South Dakota, resulting in widespread flooding throughout the area, and major downstream flooding of the Big Sioux River.

See also
 List of Minnesota weather records
 List of F5 and EF5 tornadoes
 List of North American tornadoes and tornado outbreaks
 List of Storm Prediction Center high risk days

References

F5 tornadoes
Tornadoes of 1992
Tornadoes in Iowa
Tornadoes in Kansas
Tornadoes in Minnesota
Tornadoes in Nebraska
Tornadoes in Colorado
Tornadoes in South Dakota
1992 natural disasters in the United States
June 1992 events in the United States